Ruthenian [Bread-producing] Peasants Party was a political party in Czechoslovakia. The party was founded in 1920. The most prominent personality in the party was Avgustyn Voloshyn, a renowned linguist from Uzhhorod. The party published the weekly newspaper Svoboda.

In 1923, the party changed name to Christian People's Party. In 1924, the party merged into the Czechoslovak People's Party.

References

Interwar minority parties in Czechoslovakia
Political parties established in 1920
Defunct Christian political parties
Rusyn political parties
KDU-ČSL